is a Japanese politician serving in the House of Representatives in the Diet (national legislature) as a member of the Liberal Democratic Party. A native of Kasukabe, Saitama and graduate of University of the Sacred Heart she was elected for the first time in 1996. Her father is Yoshihiko Tsuchiya, former governor of Saitama Prefecture.

References

External links 
 Official website

Members of the House of Representatives (Japan)
Female members of the House of Representatives (Japan)
Politicians from Saitama Prefecture
Living people
1952 births
Liberal Democratic Party (Japan) politicians
21st-century Japanese politicians
21st-century Japanese women politicians